Leeds North may refer to:

 The northern area of the city of Leeds, West Yorkshire, England
 Leeds North (UK Parliament constituency) (1885–1955)